The 2017 Major League Baseball postseason was the playoff tournament of Major League Baseball for the 2017 season. The winners of the League Division Series would move on to the League Championship Series to determine the pennant winners that face each other in the World Series. This was the first edition of the postseason in which home field advantage in the World Series was awarded to the team with the better regular season record, rather than the winner of the MLB All-Star Game.

In the American League, the Cleveland Indians and Boston Red Sox returned for the second year in a row, the Houston Astros and New York Yankees returned for the second time in three years, and the Minnesota Twins made their first appearance since 2010. This was the first of what is currently six consecutive postseason appearances for both the Astros and Yankees.

In the National League, the Washington Nationals returned for the fourth time in six years, the Los Angeles Dodgers made their fifth straight appearance, the Chicago Cubs made their third straight appearance, and the Arizona Diamondbacks and Colorado Rockies both returned for the first time since 2007. This was the first postseason since 2003 to feature three 100-win teams.

The postseason began on October 3, and ended on November 1, with the Astros defeating the Dodgers in seven games in the 2017 World Series. It was the Astros' first title in franchise history.

Playoff seeds
After the end of the 2016 season, the MLB changed the format of the World Series. Instead of home field advantage being awarded to the team from the league that won the MLB All-Star Game, home field advantage in the World Series was determined by the team with the better regular season record. 

The following teams qualified for the postseason:

American League
 Cleveland Indians - 102–60, Clinched AL Central
 Houston Astros - 101–61, Clinched AL West
 Boston Red Sox - 93–69, Clinched AL East
 New York Yankees - 91–71
 Minnesota Twins - 85–77

National League
 Los Angeles Dodgers - 104–58, Clinched NL West
 Washington Nationals - 97–65, Clinched NL East
 Chicago Cubs - 92–70, Clinched NL Central
 Arizona Diamondbacks - 93–69
 Colorado Rockies - 87–75

Playoff bracket

American League Wild Card

(4) New York Yankees vs. (5) Minnesota Twins 

This was the fifth postseason meeting between the Yankees and Twins, with the Yankees winning the previous four meetings. The Yankees won 8-4 and advanced to the ALDS.

National League Wild Card

(4) Arizona Diamondbacks vs. (5) Colorado Rockies 

This was the second postseason meeting between the Rockies and D-Backs. They previously met in the 2007 NLCS, which the Rockies won in a sweep en route to the World Series. Despite a late rally by the Rockies, the D-Backs held on to win 11-8, and advanced to the NLDS.

American League Division Series

(1) Cleveland Indians vs. (4) New York Yankees 

This was the fourth postseason meeting between the Indians and Yankees, with Cleveland winning two of the three previous series including both times in the ALDS (1997 and 2007). The Yankees won the 1998 ALCS. The Indians won the first two games to go up 2-0, but the Yankees rallied to come back and win the series in five games, advancing to the ALCS for the first time since 2012.

(2) Houston Astros vs. (3) Boston Red Sox 

This was the first postseason meeting between the Astros and Red Sox. The Astros won the series in four games to advance to their first ALCS. This was the first playoff series win by the Astros since the 2005 NLCS, when the team was still in the National League.

National League Division Series

(1) Los Angeles Dodgers vs. (4) Arizona Diamondbacks 

The Dodgers swept the D-Backs to advance to the NLCS for the second year in a row. To date, this is the last postseason appearance by the D-Backs.

(2) Washington Nationals vs. (3) Chicago Cubs 

†:Originally scheduled for Tuesday, October 10, but postponed due to weather.

The Cubs narrowly defeated the Nationals in five games to return to the NLCS for the third year in a row. As of 2022, this is the last playoff series win by the Cubs.

American League Championship Series

(2) Houston Astros vs. (4) New York Yankees 

This was the second postseason meeting between the Yankees and Astros. In an ALCS where neither team won a road game, the Astros defeated the Yankees to advance to the World Series for the first time since 2005.

Both teams would meet again in the 2019 ALCS, which the Astros won in six games, and in the 2022 ALCS, in which the Yankees were swept.

National League Championship Series

(1) Los Angeles Dodgers vs. (3) Chicago Cubs 

This was the third postseason meeting between the Dodgers and Cubs, and a rematch of the previous year's NLCS. The Dodgers defeated the defending World Series champion Cubs in five games to return to the World Series for the first time since 1988.

As of 2022, this is the last time the Cubs appeared in the NLCS. The Dodgers would win the NL pennant again in two of the next three postseasons - the next year they defeated the Milwaukee Brewers in seven games to capture the pennant, and in 2020 they defeated the Atlanta Braves, also in seven games.

2017 World Series

(AL2) Houston Astros vs. (NL1) Los Angeles Dodgers 

This was the second postseason meeting between the Dodgers and Astros. They had previously met in the 1981 NLDS, which the Dodgers won in five games en route to a World Series title. The Astros defeated the Dodgers in seven games to capture their first World Series title in franchise history, becoming the first team from Texas to accomplish such as feat. The Astros became the first team from Houston to win a championship since 1995, when the Houston Rockets repeated as NBA champions. The series was notable for its Game 5, which saw a record six game-tying home runs and 25 combined runs scored. The six game-tying home runs in the series to this point is the most for any World Series on record. This World Series set a new record for most players to hit a home run (14 to date in the World Series). With the teams combining to score 25 runs throughout the game, this was the highest scoring World Series game since the Florida Marlins defeated the Cleveland Indians 14–11 in Game 3 of the 1997 World Series.

The Astros' victory became controversial when the MLB determined in 2019 that they had been illegally using technology to steal signs from opposing teams during their championship season, in addition to during the following season. As a result, the Astros were fined $5 million and docked several top draft picks, while Astros manager A. J. Hinch and general manager Jeff Luhnow were suspended for one year; both were subsequently fired. However, Commissioner of Baseball Rob Manfred opted against punishing any of the players involved or revoking the Astros' World Series title. ESPN writer Sam Miller opined that although competitive and memorable, the 2017 World Series "produced a champion we all regret having felt happy for".

References

External links
 League Baseball Standings & Expanded Standings - 2017

 
Major League Baseball postseason